Alberto Guglielmone (1888–1968) was an Argentine general.

References 

Argentine generals
1888 births
1968 deaths
Argentine people of Italian descent